The Guksu (Korean: 국수전, Hanja: 國手戰) was a Go competition in South Korea. It was held 59 times beginning in 1956, and was discontinued in 2016.

Outline
The Guksu was a Go competition held by the Hanguk Kiwon, and sponsored by The Dong-a Ilbo. Guksu literally means 'hand of the nation', or essentially the best player in the country. It was the longest-running Korean Go competition. Each year, a tournament was held to determine a challenger, who would play against the defending champion. (The only exceptions were the 1st Guksu and the 53rd Guksu in 2009, when the titleholder Lee Sedol went on leave and did not defend his title.)

When the competition was last held (the 59th Guksu), the winner's prize was 45 million won, and the runner-up's prize was 15 million won.

Past winners and runners-up

References

External links
Korea Baduk Association page (in Korean)

Go competitions in South Korea